Brenitsa Glacier is the 14 km long and 4.5 km wide glacier on Oscar II Coast, Graham Land in Antarctica situated southwest of Drygalski Glacier, west of Rogosh Glacier and east of Hektoria Glacier.  Draining southwards from the south slopes of Foster Plateau east of Mount Quandary to flow into Vaughan Inlet, Weddell Sea next east of Hektoria Glacier.

The feature is named after the settlements of Brenitsa in northern and northeastern Bulgaria.

Location
British mapping in 1974.

See also
 List of glaciers in the Antarctic
 Glaciology

Maps
Antarctic Digital Database (ADD). Scale 1:250000 topographic map of Antarctica. Scientific Committee on Antarctic Research (SCAR). Since 1993, regularly upgraded and updated.

References
 Brenitsa Glacier SCAR Composite Antarctic Gazetteer
 Bulgarian Antarctic Gazetteer Antarctic Place-names Commission (Bulgarian9
 Basic data (English)

External links
 Brenitsa Glacier. Copernix satellite image

Glaciers of Oscar II Coast
Bulgaria and the Antarctic